Fresno de Torote is a municipality of the autonomous community of Madrid in central Spain. It belongs to the comarca of Alcalá.

Sights include the church of San Esteban, in Mudéjar-Renaissance style.

References

External links
 

Municipalities in the Community of Madrid